Kosmic Kart is a kart chassis brand being part of OTK Kart Group based in Italy. Kosmic Kart chassis are produced by the Tony Kart factory and share the Tony Kart frames layouts as well as OTK (Original Tony Kart) components. The brand is officially represented internationally by its own factory karting team - Kosmic Racing Department managed by the OneAim SARL company in Luxembourg. Currently (2021) team has 8 drivers in 2 FIA international direct drive categories - OK and OKJ. The team can be seen on many international events, such as FIA Karting Championships and WSK Series

Kosmic kart chassis can be found in many of the international races and championships such as the FIA Karting World Championship, Rotax Max Challenge, and Vortex ROK cup.

External links 
 Kosmic Kart Official website
 Kosmic Kart UK Distributor Official UK Distributor

Kart manufacturers of Italy